Russell Westbrook III (born November 12, 1988) is an American professional basketball player for the Los Angeles Clippers of the National Basketball Association (NBA). A member of the NBA 75th Anniversary Team, he is a nine-time NBA All-Star and earned the NBA Most Valuable Player Award (MVP) for the 2016–17 season. He is also a nine-time All-NBA Team member, led the league in scoring in 2014–15 and 2016–17, and won back-to-back NBA All-Star Game MVP awards in 2015 and 2016.

In 2017, the year he won the league MVP award, Westbrook became one of two players in NBA history to average a triple-double for a season, along with Oscar Robertson in 1962. He also set a record for the most triple-doubles in a season, with 42. He went on to average a triple-double the following two seasons as well as lead the league in assists and become the first player to lead the league in points and assists in multiple seasons. In 2020–21, Westbrook averaged a triple-double for the fourth time in five seasons, and he passed Robertson for the most career triple-doubles in NBA history.

Westbrook played college basketball for the UCLA Bruins and earned third-team all-conference honors in the Pac-10. He was selected with the fourth overall pick in the 2008 NBA draft by the Seattle SuperSonics, who then relocated to Oklahoma City that same week. Westbrook has represented the United States national team twice, winning gold medals in the 2010 FIBA World Championship and the 2012 Olympics. In 2019, he was traded to the Houston Rockets, playing one season for the organization before being traded again to the Washington Wizards in 2020. After a season in Washington, he was traded to the Los Angeles Lakers in 2021. After two seasons with the Lakers, Westbrook was traded to the Utah Jazz in 2023 and was bought out of his contract, joining the Los Angeles Clippers afterwards.

Early life

Westbrook was born in Long Beach, California, to Russell Westbrook Jr. and Shannon Horton. He has a younger brother named Raynard. Growing up in Hawthorne, Westbrook and his best friend Khelcey Barrs III had hopes of going to UCLA and playing together. At age 16, Barrs was already known to have excellent basketball skills and received college scholarship offers. In May 2004, Barrs died from an enlarged heart during a pick-up game. After Barrs' death, Westbrook seemed even more determined to excel in honor of his best friend's memory.

High school career
He did not start on his school's varsity team until his junior year, and did not receive his first college recruiting letter until the summer before his senior year. Westbrook grew to his adult height of  that same summer.

During his senior year, Westbrook averaged 25.1 points, 8.7 rebounds, 3.1 steals, and 2.3 assists and helped lead them to a 25–4 record. That same season, he recorded 14 double-doubles, scored 30 or more points on eight separate occasions, and registered a career-best 51 points at Carson on January 6, 2006. Westbrook initially did not attract much attention from top college basketball programs. After his height increased, contributing to him averaging more than 25 points per game and becoming a solid college basketball prospect, coach Ben Howland recruited him to play for the UCLA Bruins. Westbrook declined other offers while waiting for the Bruins' Jordan Farmar to leave early for the NBA and free up a scholarship.

College career

Westbrook wore number 0 throughout his career at the University of California, Los Angeles. As a freshman in 2006–07, he played as a backup to Darren Collison and was primarily used as a defender and energy player off the bench. Westbrook averaged 3.4 points, 0.8 rebounds, and 0.7 assists on the year. During the off-season, he trained extensively, both in the weight room and in the gym, where he faced NBA veterans who visited Los Angeles. The next season, Collison was injured and Westbrook was named the starter. He finished the season averaging 12.7 points, 3.9 rebounds, 4.7 assists and 1.6 steals. At the end of the year, he was named All-Pac-10 Third Team and won the Pac-10 Defensive Player of the Year.

UCLA advanced to the Final Four during each of Westbrook's seasons with the team. In 2007, they lost to eventual national champion Florida, 76–66 and in 2008, they lost 78–63 to Memphis. After two years at UCLA, Westbrook decided to forgo his final two years and enter the 2008 NBA draft. He stayed in school and finished the quarter, a rarity for high draft picks declaring early for the draft.

Professional career

Oklahoma City Thunder (2008–2019)

All-Rookie honors and first playoffs (2008–10)

Westbrook was selected 4th overall in the 2008 NBA draft by the Seattle SuperSonics, which then relocated to Oklahoma City and became the Thunder six days later. He signed with the team on July 5, 2008. On March 2, 2009, Westbrook recorded his first career triple-double with 17 points, 10 rebounds and 10 assists. He was the first rookie since Chris Paul and the third rookie in Sonics/Thunder franchise history (Art Harris and Gary Payton) to record a triple-double.

Westbrook averaged 15.3 points, 5.3 assists, 4.9 rebounds, and 1.3 steals on the season. He finished fourth in the 2008–09 NBA Rookie of the Year voting behind Rookie of the Year winner Derrick Rose (Chicago Bulls), O. J. Mayo (Memphis Grizzlies) and Brook Lopez (New Jersey Nets). He was named to the NBA's NBA All-Rookie First Team.

In his second year, and first season as a full-time starter, Westbrook went on to average 16.1 points, 8.0 assists, 4.9 rebounds, and 1.3 steals on the season. On April 4, 2010, he recorded 10 points and a career-high 16 assists in a 116–108 victory over the Minnesota Timberwolves. The Thunder made a huge turnaround by more than doubling their wins from the previous season and qualified for the playoffs with a 50–32 record. The Thunder were eliminated by the eventual champion Los Angeles Lakers in the first round. In the series, Westbrook stepped up his play from the regular season, averaging 20.5 points, 6.0 rebounds, 6.0 assists, and 3.2 steals.

First All-Star, All-NBA and NBA finals appearances (2010–12)

On November 26, 2010, Westbrook scored a then-career-high 43 points against the Indiana Pacers. On December 1, 2010, he scored 38 points with 9 assists and achieved a new career-high of 15 rebounds in a triple-overtime win over the New Jersey Nets. Westbrook was selected by the NBA head coaches to be a Western Conference reserve for the 2011 NBA All-Star Game. This was his first all-star appearance. Westbrook finished the season with averages of 21.9 points, 8.2 assists, 4.6 rebounds, and 1.9 steals. He was named to the All-NBA Second Team for the first time. The Thunder finished the season at 55–27 and lost to the eventual world champion Dallas Mavericks in the Western Conference Finals. Westbrook averaged 23.8 points, 6.4 assists, and 5.4 rebounds in the playoffs.

In the 2011–12 season, Westbrook was again selected by the coaches to participate in the 2012 NBA All-Star Game. On March 23, 2012, he scored a career-high 45 points in a 149–140 double overtime win over the Minnesota Timberwolves. He averaged 23.6 points, 5.5 assists, 4.6 rebounds and 1.7 steals for the lockout-shortened season and was voted to the All-NBA Second Team for the second year in a row. Westbrook helped lead the Thunder to the NBA Finals for the first time since the franchise relocated but they would lose in five games to the Miami Heat. On June 12, in Game 1 of the Finals, Westbrook recorded 27 points and 11 assists in a 105–94 victory. He joined Michael Jordan as the only players with 25+ points and 10+ assists in their NBA Finals debut. In a Game 4 loss, Westbrook scored a playoff career-high 43 points.

Season-ending injury (2012–13)

Westbrook was once again selected for the NBA All-Star Game. He finished the 2012–13 season averaging 23.2 points, 7.4 assists, 5.2 rebounds, and 1.8 steals per game. Westbrook helped lead the Oklahoma City Thunder to the playoffs and the 1st seed in the Western Conference. They would go on to face the 8th seed Houston Rockets in the first round. On April 25, 2013, in the second game of the series, Westbrook injured his right knee when Rockets guard Patrick Beverley collided with him in an attempt to steal the ball. Although Westbrook was clearly bothered by the injury, he would continue playing and finished the game with 29 points. It was then revealed the next day that he had suffered a slight tear in his right meniscus. He had surgery on April 27, 2013, and was declared out for the rest of the playoffs. Without Westbrook, the Thunder defeated the Rockets in 6 games but fell to the Memphis Grizzlies in 5 games in the next round. Westbrook was named to the All-NBA Second Team for the third consecutive year.

Multiple surgeries and comeback (2013–15)
Prior to the start of the 2013–14 season, Westbrook had a second surgery on his right knee, which set back his return to basketball. Despite reports that he would miss the first two weeks of the regular season, Westbrook would miss only the first two games. On December 25, 2013, Westbrook recorded 14 points, 13 rebounds, and 10 assists as Oklahoma City beat the New York Knicks 123–94. This was just the eighth triple-double on Christmas Day in NBA history. The win was also the largest margin of victory in a Christmas Day game in NBA history. On the day after his Christmas-day game, it was announced that Westbrook would undergo arthroscopic surgery on his right knee and would be out until after the All-Star break. During this time, The Thunder were able to remain competitive despite his absence due mainly to Kevin Durant's stellar play. Westbrook returned to the lineup on February 20, 2014. He played the rest of the season on limited minutes and sat out the second night of back-to-backs.

On March 4, 2014, Westbrook recorded his second triple-double of the season. He recorded 13 points, 14 assists, and 10 rebounds, in just 20 minutes in a 125–92 victory over the Philadelphia 76ers. This was the second fastest recorded triple-double in NBA history. Westbrook and the Thunder finished with a 59–23 record earning the 2nd seed in the Western Conference. They advanced to the Western Conference Finals where they faced the San Antonio Spurs. On May 27, 2014, in a Game 4 victory, Westbrook recorded 40 points, 5 rebounds, 10 assists and 5 steals. In doing so, he joined Michael Jordan as the only other player to post those numbers in a playoff game. The Thunder lost the series to the eventual NBA champion Spurs in six games. Westbrook averaged 26.7 points, 8.1 assists, and 7.3 rebounds in the postseason, and became the first player since Oscar Robertson in 1964 to average at least 26 points, 8 assists, and 7 rebounds in the playoffs.

After scoring 38 points in a 106–89 loss to the Portland Trail Blazers in the 2014–15 season opener, Westbrook suffered a small fracture of the second metacarpal in his right hand the following game against the Los Angeles Clippers and subsequently missed 14 games with the injury. He joined Durant on the sidelines after Durant fractured his right foot during preseason and was ruled out for six to eight weeks. With the pair both inactive for the start of the season, the Thunder dropped to a 4–12 record prior to Westbrook's return on November 28 against the New York Knicks. In Westbrook's first game back, he led the Thunder to a win over the Knicks with 32 points. Durant returned the following game to face the New Orleans Pelicans, as the pair helped the Thunder go on a seven-game winning streak to bring the Thunder back into playoff contention. On January 16, 2015, Westbrook recorded his ninth career triple-double with 17 points, 15 rebounds, and a career-high 17 assists in a 127–115 win over the Golden State Warriors, becoming just the fifth player in NBA history to record a stat line of 15–15–15 in a game.

After tying a career-high 45 points on February 4, 2015 in a 102–91 win over the New Orleans Pelicans, Westbrook broke that mark to score a new career-high of 48 points two days later, this time in a 116–113 loss to the Pelicans. After being injured the previous year, Westbrook returned to the All-Star game in 2015. He tallied 41 points, and was named the All-Star MVP. He scored 27 points in 11 minutes in the first half, setting an All-Star record for points in a half, and finished one point shy of the All-Star game record set by Wilt Chamberlain (42) in 1962. On February 22, Westbrook recorded 21 points and tied a career-high 17 assists in a 119–94 win over the Denver Nuggets. Two days later, he recorded 20 points, 11 rebounds and 10 assists in a 105–92 win over the Indiana Pacers. In doing so he claimed his third triple-double of the season and 11th of his career despite resting for the entire fourth quarter. On February 27, in a loss to the Portland Trail Blazers, Westbrook recorded 40 points, 13 rebounds and 11 assists to become the first player to have three straight triple-doubles since LeBron James did so in 2009. Westbrook finished the month of February averaging 31.2 points, 9.1 rebounds and 10.3 assists per game, and became just the second player in NBA history to average 30 points, 9 rebounds and 10 assists per game for a calendar month with at least 10 games played, joining Robertson, who accomplished the feat multiple times.

On March 4, Westbrook set career highs with 49 points and 16 rebounds, and added 10 assists for his fourth consecutive triple-double, helping the Thunder defeat the Philadelphia 76ers 123–118 in overtime. He subsequently became the first player since Michael Jordan in 1989 to have four consecutive triple-doubles, and the first since Jordan that year to have back-to-back triple-doubles with at least 40 points. It was also the most points by any player with a triple-double since Larry Bird also scored 49 in 1992. His streak came to an end the following night against the Chicago Bulls as he recorded 43 points, 8 rebounds and 7 assists in a 105–108 loss. On March 8, he recorded his fifth triple-double in six games to help the Thunder defeat the Toronto Raptors, 108–104. He had 30 points, matched a career-high with 17 assists and grabbed 11 rebounds for his seventh triple-double of the season and 15th of his career. In much too similar fashion, Westbrook recorded yet another triple-double on March 13 against the Minnesota Timberwolves, collecting his sixth in eight games and scored 15 of his 29 points (with 12 assists and 10 rebounds) in the fourth quarter, helping the Thunder pull away for a 113–99 win. He went on to record three more triple-doubles to finish the season. On April 12, he scored a career-high 54 points on 21-of-43 shooting in a losing effort to the Indiana Pacers. He went on to help the Thunder win the final two games of the 2014–15 season, but it was not enough to position the Thunder in the playoffs, as they finished ninth in the West with a 45–37 record.

Second All-Star Game MVP and coming up short (2015–16)
To begin the 2015–16 season, Westbrook and Durant both dropped 40 points against the Orlando Magic on October 30, becoming the first teammates in NBA history to do so multiple times, having previously done it in 2012. In December against Denver, they became the first teammates to each have at least 25 points and 10 assists in a regulation game since 1996. On January 4, he was named Western Conference co-Player of the Month for December alongside Durant.

On January 20, 2016, Westbrook recorded 16 points, 15 assists, eight rebounds, and five steals against the Charlotte Hornets, becoming just the fourth player in NBA history with at least 15 points, 15 assists, five rebounds and five steals in a game. On February 3, he recorded his third straight triple-double and eighth of the season with 24 points, a career-high 19 rebounds and 14 assists in a 117–114 win over the Orlando Magic. Westbrook was voted to start in his first All-Star Game in 2016, and he earned his second MVP award after a 196–173 win by the West. He recorded 31 points, eight rebounds, five assists, and five steals in 22 minutes, and became the first player in All-Star history to win consecutive MVPs outright. Bob Pettit is the other player to have won two back-to-back awards, winning in 1958 and sharing it with Elgin Baylor in 1959. On March 9, he recorded his 11th triple-double of the season with 25 points, a career-high 20 assists and 11 rebounds in a 120–108 win over the Los Angeles Clippers. The stat line marked the NBA's first triple-double with at least 25 points, 20 assists and 10 rebounds since Magic Johnson did it for the Los Angeles Lakers in 1988, and the first with at least 20 points and 20 assists since Rod Strickland did it for the Washington Wizards in 1998. On March 22, he recorded his 15th triple-double of the season and 34th of his career with 21 points, 15 assists and 13 rebounds in a 111–107 win over the Houston Rockets, setting the most triple-doubles by a player in a season since 1988–89, when Magic Johnson had 17 and Michael Jordan had 15. It was also Westbrook's sixth triple-double in March, the most by a player in a calendar month since Jordan had seven in April 1989. On April 11, with his 18th triple-double of the season in a win over the Los Angeles Lakers, he tied Magic Johnson (1981–82) for the most in a single season in the past 50 seasons.

In the playoffs, Westbrook helped guide the Thunder past the Dallas Mavericks in the first round, and then the San Antonio Spurs in the second round. In the Western Conference Finals, they faced the defending champion Golden State Warriors, and took home court advantage after stealing Game 1 of the series. With the series tied at 1–1 after Game 2, the Thunder returned home and took a 3–1 advantage with two home wins. In Game 4, Westbrook recorded his fifth career playoff triple-double with 36 points, 11 rebounds and 11 assists in a 118–94 win. Despite going up 3–1 in the series, the Thunder were defeated 4–3 by the Warriors to bow out of the playoffs.

MVP and first triple-double season (2016–17)

Following the off-season departure of Durant, trade speculation began swirling around Westbrook, with his contract set to expire in 2017. The Thunder were determined to keep Westbrook and held off all trade talks in order to work out an extension. On August 4, 2016, Westbrook signed a three-year, $85.7 million contract extension with the Thunder. He became the focal point of the team. In the Thunder's second game of 2016–17 on October 28, Westbrook recorded his 38th career regular season triple-double with 51 points, 13 rebounds and 10 assists in a 113–110 overtime win over the Phoenix Suns, marking the first 50-point triple-double since Kareem Abdul-Jabbar had one in 1975. Westbrook also took a career-high 44 shots. Two days later, he recorded 33 points, 12 rebounds and 16 assists in a 113–96 win over the Los Angeles Lakers, joining Robertson, Magic Johnson, and Jerry Lucas as the only players in NBA history with two triple-doubles in the first three games of a season. On November 30, he recorded his fourth straight triple-double with 35 points, 14 rebounds and 11 assists in a 126–115 overtime win over the Washington Wizards, becoming just the second player in NBA history to average a triple-double heading into December (joining Robertson). He extended that streak to seven straight on December 9 with 27 points, 10 rebounds and 10 assists in a 102–99 loss to the Houston Rockets—the longest triple-double streak since Michael Jordan had seven straight in 1989.

Forty-one games into the season, Westbrook was averaging 30.8 points, 10.7 rebounds, and 10.5 assists per game, marking the latest anyone had averaged a triple-double since Robertson in 1966–67, when he became the first player to average a triple-double for an entire season (30.8 points, 12.5 rebounds and 11.4 assists). On January 15, 2017, Westbrook had 36 points, 11 rebounds and 10 assists for his 20th triple-double of the season, as he helped the Thunder defeat the Sacramento Kings 122–118. He joined Robertson (five times) and Wilt Chamberlain (twice) as the only players in NBA history to record 20 triple-doubles in a season. His 21st triple-double of the season came on January 18 in a loss to former teammate Durant and the Golden State Warriors. On January 23, Westbrook hit a pull-up jumper with 1.4 seconds left to lift the Thunder to a 97–95 win over the Utah Jazz. He finished with 38 points, 10 rebounds and 10 assists for his 22nd triple-double of the season and 59th for his career, tying Larry Bird for fifth on the career list. Two days later, he had 27 points, 12 rebounds and 10 assists in a 114–105 win over the New Orleans Pelicans, thus passing Bird with his 60th career triple-double. Heading into All-Star Weekend, Westbrook was averaging 31.1 points, 10.5 rebounds and 10.1 assists in 57 games. Westbrook went on to record three straight triple-doubles coming out of the All-Star break, giving him 67 for his career and 30 on the season.

On March 7, Westbrook's career-high 58 points was not enough to lift the Thunder over the Portland Trail Blazers, losing 126–121. His 31st triple-double of the season, which came on March 9 against the San Antonio Spurs, matched Wilt Chamberlain's 1967–68 campaign for the second-most in a season. He surpassed Chamberlain's record with his 32nd triple-double on March 11 against the Jazz. Westbrook went on to tie Robertson's single-season record of 41 triple-doubles on April 4 against the Milwaukee Bucks. Westbrook also moved into a tie with Chamberlain for fourth on the career list with his 78th triple-double. Three days later, he joined Robertson (who did it in 1961–62) as the only players in NBA history to average a triple-double for a season, needing just six assists against the Phoenix Suns to clinch the triple-double average. His historic 42nd triple-double, to break Robertson's record of most triple-doubles in a season, came in a 106–105 away victory against the Denver Nuggets on April 9. Westbrook scored 18 of his 50 points in the last five minutes, including a 36-foot game-winning buzzer-beater, to overcome a 14-point deficit. He moved into fourth place for most triple-doubles in NBA history with 79, surpassing Chamberlain's 78. It was his third career 50-point triple-double, all of which came in 2016–17, the most by any player in NBA history. The Thunder finished the regular season with a 47–35 record and entered the playoffs as the 6th seed.

On April 19, in Game 2 of the Thunder's first-round playoff series against the Rockets, Westbrook had 51 points in the highest-scoring triple-double in playoff history. Westbrook set a franchise playoff scoring record and added 13 assists and 10 rebounds, marking his sixth career playoff triple-double. Despite his efforts, the Thunder lost 115–111 to go down 2–0 in the series. In Game 4 four days later, Westbrook had 35 points, 14 rebounds and 14 assists, but could not lead the Thunder to a win, as they went down 3–1 in the series with a 113–109 loss. Westbrook joined Wilt Chamberlain as the only players to claim three consecutive playoff triple-doubles. With a loss to the Rockets in Game 5, the Thunder bowed out of the playoffs with a 4–1 series defeat. Westbrook had 47 points in Game 5 and came up just one assist shy of his fourth straight triple-double. On June 26, 2017, he was named the recipient of the NBA Most Valuable Player Award at the first-ever NBA Awards Show. He was the first winner from a team with fewer than 50 wins since Moses Malone in 1982.

Second triple-double season and playoff disappointment (2017–18)
On September 29, 2017, Westbrook signed a five-year, $205 million contract extension with the Thunder. The deal starts with the 2018–19 season and delivers Westbrook the biggest guaranteed contract in NBA history—six seasons and $233 million through 2022–23. It includes a player option on the 2022–23 season. Continuing on from his historic 2016–17 season, Westbrook had a triple-double in the Thunder's season opener against the New York Knicks on October 19. Playing alongside new All-Star teammates Paul George and Carmelo Anthony, Westbrook had 21 points, 10 rebounds and 16 assists in a 105–84 win. On October 28, he had 12 points, 13 rebounds and 13 assists in a 101–69 win over the Chicago Bulls, becoming the first player in league history to record a triple-double against 29 different opponents—Westbrook had recorded a triple-double against every NBA opponent except for the Bulls prior to October 28. On December 15, he recorded his 10th triple-double of the season with 27 points, 18 rebounds and 15 assists in a 119–117 triple overtime win over the Philadelphia 76ers. After starting the season with an 8–12 record, the Thunder improved to 20–15 with a 124–107 win over the Toronto Raptors on December 27. Westbrook had 30 points, 13 assists and eight rebounds against the Raptors, as the Thunder won their sixth straight game. Two days later, he recorded 40 points, 14 rebounds and nine assists in a 97–95 loss to the Milwaukee Bucks. During the game, Westbrook scored his 16,000th career point, making him the 112th NBA player to do so.

On January 20, Westbrook had 23 and 20 assists in a 148–124 win over the Cleveland Cavaliers. On January 25, he scored a season-high 46 points in a 121–112 win over the Washington Wizards. On February 1, Westbrook had 21 assists, one shy of his career high, to go with 20 points and nine rebounds in a 127–124 loss to the Denver Nuggets. On February 14, he recorded his 17th triple-double of the season with 23 points, 15 assists and 13 rebounds in a 121–114 win over the Memphis Grizzlies. On March 13, he recorded 32 points, 12 assists and 12 rebounds in a 119–107 win over the Atlanta Hawks, becoming the fourth player in NBA history to record 100 triple-doubles, joining Oscar Robertson (181 triple-doubles), Magic Johnson (138) and Jason Kidd (107). He became the third-fastest player to reach the milestone—Robertson needed 277 games, Johnson needed 656 games, and Westbrook needed 736 games. On April 3, he had 44 points and 16 rebounds in a 111–107 loss to the Warriors.

On April 9, Westbrook recorded his 25th triple-double of the season with 23 points, 18 rebounds and 13 assists in a 115–93 win over the Miami Heat, thus clinching a playoff spot. Two days later, in the regular season finale against the Grizzlies, Westbrook clinched a triple-double average for the second straight season. He entered the night needing 16 rebounds to clinch the triple-double average. He pulled down his 16th rebound with just over nine minutes left in the third quarter and received a standing ovation. He finished with just six points, but had a career-high 20 rebounds and 19 assists. Westbrook finished as the league leader in assists, averaging 10.3 per game, and he was named to the All-NBA Second Team. In Game 5 of the Thunder's first-round playoff series against the Utah Jazz, Westbrook scored 33 of his 45 points in the second half, as Oklahoma City rallied from 25 points down to fight off elimination and beat the Jazz 107–99. He also had 15 rebounds and seven assists. In Game 6, Westbrook scored 46 points in a 96–91 loss, as the Thunder bowed out of the playoffs with a 4–2 defeat.

Third triple-double season and final season in Oklahoma City (2018–19)
Westbrook missed the preseason and the first two regular season games after having a procedure in September 2018 to deal with inflammation in his right knee. In his season debut for the Thunder on October 21, Westbrook had 32 points, 12 rebounds and eight assists in 35 minutes in a 131–120 loss to the Sacramento Kings. On November 19, he returned to the line-up after missing five games with a left ankle sprain and had 29 points and 13 assists in a 117–113 loss to the Kings. On November 21, he recorded his first triple-double of the season with 11 points, 13 assists and 11 rebounds in a 123–95 win over the Golden State Warriors. On November 28, he recorded his third triple-double of the season with 23 points, 19 rebounds and 15 assists in a 100–83 win over the Cleveland Cavaliers. He moved into a tie for third place on the NBA list for triple-doubles, with the 107th of his career matching Jason Kidd's total. He moved into sole position of third on December 5, recording his 108th career triple-double with 21 points, 17 assists and 15 rebounds in a 114–112 win over the Brooklyn Nets. On December 28, he scored 40 points in a 118–102 win over the Phoenix Suns. On December 31, he had 32 points, 11 rebounds and 11 assists for his 10th triple-double of the season in a 122–102 win over the Dallas Mavericks. On January 10, he recorded a career-high 24 assists to go with 24 points and 13 rebounds in a 154–147 double-overtime loss to the San Antonio Spurs.

On January 31, Westbrook received his eighth career All-Star selection by being named a Western Conference reserve. On February 5, he had his seventh straight triple-double with 16 points, 16 assists and 15 rebounds in a 132–122 win over the Orlando Magic. He matched the longest triple-double streak of his career with his 20th of the season and 124th overall. On February 7, he had 15 points, 15 assists and 13 rebounds in a 117–95 win over the Memphis Grizzlies, thus the longest triple-double streak of his career and sitting one short of Wilt Chamberlain's NBA record of nine straight set in 1968. On February 9, in a 117–112 win over the Houston Rockets, Westbrook had 21 points, 11 assists and 12 rebounds to match Chamberlain's record streak. On February 11, Westbrook broke Chamberlain's record after tallying 21 points, 14 rebounds and 11 assists in a 120–111 win over the Portland Trail Blazers. On February 14, he recorded 44 points, 14 rebounds and 11 assists in a 131–122 loss to the New Orleans Pelicans. In addition to increasing his triple-double streak, Westbrook surpassed Gary Payton (18,207 points) as the career scoring leader in franchise history. His streak of 11 consecutive games with a triple-double ended in the first game after the All-Star break, as he recorded 43 points, 15 rebounds and eight assists in a 148–147 double-overtime win over the Utah Jazz.

On March 17, Westbrook was suspended for one game without pay for receiving his 16th technical foul of the season. On April 2, Westbrook had 20 points, 20 rebounds and 21 assists in a 119–103 win over the Los Angeles Lakers. He became the second player in NBA history to record 20 points, 20 rebounds, and 20 assists in a single game; the only other coming from Chamberlain in 1968. Westbrook also tied Chamberlain for second all time in 15-point, 15-rebound, 15-assist games with eight. On April 5, his performance of 19 points, 15 assists, and eight rebounds in a 123–110 win against the Detroit Pistons ensured he would clinch his third consecutive season averaging a triple-double—the first time in NBA history. The game also secured his position as league leader in assists per game for the third consecutive season, achieved only by six other players in NBA history. In the Thunder's regular-season finale on April 10 against the Milwaukee Bucks, Westbrook posted his 34th triple-double of the season to reach 138 for his career, tying Magic Johnson for second place on the career triple-double list. The Thunder went on to lose in five games to the Trail Blazers in the first round of the playoffs, with Westbrook recording two triple-doubles during the series. It was the third straight season they were eliminated in the first round.

Houston Rockets (2019–2020)

On July 16, 2019, Westbrook was traded to the Houston Rockets for All-Star Chris Paul, two protected first-round picks, and two first-round pick swaps. The move reunited Westbrook with former teammate James Harden; they both expressed mutual interest and enthusiasm in playing together at this stage in their careers. Harden spent his first three seasons in the league (2009–2012) on the Thunder with Westbrook, and prior to playing in Houston, they last played together in the 2012 NBA Finals.

Westbrook made his Rockets debut in a 117–111 loss against the Milwaukee Bucks on October 24, 2019, leading the team with 24 points, 16 rebounds, and seven assists in 33 minutes of play. He joins Hakeem Olajuwon as the only Rockets players in franchise history to put up at least 20 points, 15 rebounds and five assists in a season opener. In Westbrook's second game as a Rocket on October 26, 2019, he became second all time in career triple-doubles, passing Magic Johnson with a 28-point, 13-assist, and 10-rebound performance in a 126–123 win against the New Orleans Pelicans. On December 7, 2019, Westbrook got his third consecutive triple-double with 24 points, 14 rebounds, and 11 assists on 10-of-18 shooting after going 14-of-57 in the previous two games. On January 3, 2020, Westbrook became the third player in NBA history with 19,000 points, 6,000 rebounds, and 7,000 assists after a 20-point, 7-rebound, and 4-assist performance.

On January 9, 2020, Westbrook made his return to Oklahoma City for the first time as a visitor, scoring 34 points, grabbing 2 rebounds, and passing for 5 assists on 14-of-26 shooting from the field in the 113–92 loss. With his triple-double against Oklahoma City on January 20, he joined LeBron James as the only two players to have logged triple-doubles against all 30 NBA teams. On January 24, Westbrook scored a season-high 45 points on 16-of-27 shooting from the field, along with 10 assists and 6 rebounds, in a 131–124 win against the Minnesota Timberwolves. In February, he had 33.4 points per game, 7.3 rebounds per game, and 6 assists per game in addition to 54.9% field goal shooting and 40% three-point shooting. In that stretch, the Rockets went 7–1.

The suspension of the 2019–20 NBA season began in March due to the COVID-19 pandemic in the United States. In July, Westbrook tested positive for COVID-19. He recovered and was able to join his team later that month in Orlando, Florida, for the league's restart. In their third game back, Westbrook strained his right quad and missed four of the five remaining regular season games. In the playoffs, he missed the first four games of the opening series against Oklahoma City, which was tied 2–2. He helped Houston advance to the semifinals, where they were eliminated 4–1 by the Lakers. In his eight playoff games, Westbrook averaged 17.9 points, 7.0 rebounds, and 4.6 assists per game, the worst of his postseason career.

Washington Wizards (2020–2021)

Fourth triple-double season and career triple-doubles record (2020–21)
On December 2, 2020, amidst rumors that he and Harden were unhappy and wanted out from the Rockets, Westbrook was traded to the Washington Wizards for John Wall and a 2023 lottery-protected first-round draft pick. On December 23, Westbrook made his Wizards debut, putting up 21 points, 11 rebounds, and 15 assists in a 113–107 loss to the Philadelphia 76ers. He became the sixth player in NBA history to record a triple-double in a team debut, joining Elfrid Payton, Lewis Lloyd, John Shumate, Nate Thurmond, and Oscar Robertson. He was not named to the 2021 All-Star Game, missing it for the first time since 2014. On March 30, 2021, Westbrook became the first player since Magic Johnson in 1988 to record a 30–10–20 triple double with 35 points, a then season-high 21 assists, and 14 rebounds in a 132–124 win over the Indiana Pacers. His 16th triple double in his 38th game with the Wizards, Westbrook broke Darrell Walker's franchise record for career triple-doubles, which had stood for 30 years. Westbrook needed only three months with the Wizards and 245 fewer games than Walker, who played three seasons with Washington (1988–1991). Westbrook also tied Robertson as the only players with five seasons of at least 15 triple doubles.

On April 17, Westbrook had 15 points, 14 rebounds, and 11 assists in a win against the Detroit Pistons for his 25th triple-double of the season, becoming the first NBA player with at least 25 triple-doubles each in four separate seasons; he also became the first in league history to amass 15 triple-doubles over a 20-game span. Westbrook ended the month with an NBA record 14 triple-doubles (in 17 games), breaking the mark of 11 set by Wilt Chamberlain in 1968. With his performances in March and April, Westbrook became the first player to record at least 300 points, 150 assists, and 150 rebounds in consecutive months since Chamberlain in 1968. His play coincided with the Wizards going 12–2 to finish April after falling to a season-low 15 games under .500 on April 5.

On May 4, Westbrook clinched his fourth season averaging a triple-double after tallying 14 points, a career-high 21 rebounds, and a new season-high 24 assists in a 154–141 win against the Pacers. On May 8, he put up 33 points, 19 rebounds, and 15 assists in a 133–132 overtime win against the Pacers, notching his 181st career-triple-double to tie Robertson's record for the most career triple-doubles in NBA history. On May 10, he put up 28 points, 13 rebounds, and 21 assists in a 125–124 loss against the Atlanta Hawks for his 182nd career triple-double to pass Robertson for the most in NBA history; Westbrook also joined Robertson, LeBron James, and Gary Payton as the only four players in league history with at least 20,000 points and 8,000 assists. On May 15, in a 120–105 win over the Cleveland Cavaliers in which Westbrook recorded another triple double with 21 points, 12 rebounds, and 17 assists, the Wizards completed their comeback from 17–32 to 33–38 and clinched a play-in spot.

On May 16, in a 115–110 win over the Charlotte Hornets, the Wizards finished the season with a 34–38 record and were seeded 8th to face the 7th seeded Boston Celtics in the play-in thanks to a 17–6 record over the last six weeks. With Westbrook posting a triple double with 23 points, 15 rebounds, and 10 assists, he captured his third NBA assist title, averaging a career-high 11.7 assists per game. He also averaged 22.2 points on 43.9% shooting and a career-high 11.5 rebounds; the Wizards finished with a 23–15 record when Westbrook recorded a triple-double. After a 118–100 loss to the Celtics for the No. 7 spot in the play-in tournament, Westbrook alongside Bradley Beal led the Wizards to a blowout win 142–115 over the Pacers to clinch the last the playoffs spot and Wizards' first playoff appearance since 2018; it was Westbrook's sixth straight season in the playoffs. Despite averaging a triple-double with 19.0 points, 11.8 assists, and 10.5 rebounds per game, the Wizards lost to the top seeded 76ers in five games in the first round.

Los Angeles Lakers (2021–2023)

Down season (2021–22)
On August 6, 2021, Westbrook was traded to the Los Angeles Lakers for Kentavious Caldwell-Pope, Kyle Kuzma, Montrezl Harrell and the draft rights to Isaiah Jackson, the third time he was traded and his fourth team in three years. On October 19, Westbrook made his Lakers debut, putting up eight points on 4-of-12 shooting from the field, five rebounds, and three assists in a 121–114 loss to the Golden State Warriors. On October 27, Westbrook put up 20 points, 14 rebounds, and 10 assists in a 123–115 loss to the Oklahoma City Thunder and joined LeBron James, Jason Kidd, and Oscar Robertson as the only players in NBA history to record at least 7,000 career rebounds and 7,000 career assists.

As his first season with the Lakers progressed, Westbrook received criticism for his perceived poor quality of play. Westbrook was criticized following a 4-for-20 shooting performance in a 122–115 loss to the Brooklyn Nets on Christmas Day. The Lakers had a 21–20 record at the halfway point of the regular season and Westbrook was often a recipient of the blame for the team's struggles relative to its 2020 championship season. Westbrook shot 30 percent from the three-point line and turned the ball over 4.6 times per game through early January, and he received criticism for a particular game against the Minnesota Timberwolves where he turned the ball over nine times. Westbrook later responded to critics, saying that they were only looking at the stat sheet and not his overall play on the court.

On January 4, 2022, in a 122–114 win over the Sacramento Kings, Westbrook had his first game without turnovers since March 14, 2016. In January 19, he was benched by Lakers head coach Frank Vogel in the final four minutes of a home loss against the Indiana Pacers. On January 29, in a 114–117 loss to the Charlotte Hornets, he scored 35 points, of which 30 in the second half (16 points in the fourth quarter from a 20-point deficit) were the most by any Laker since Kobe Bryant's last game on April 13, 2016. For the third time in his career and the first since 2015, Westbrook missed the playoffs after a 110–121 loss to the Phoenix Suns. Following Vogel's firing after the season, he said, "I'm not sure what his issue was with me." The coach had kept him in the starting lineup all season despite pressure to bring him off the bench. Westbrook attended new head coach Darvin Ham's introductory press conference, where the coach said "Russell Westbrook is one of the best players our league has ever seen, and there's still a ton left in the tank." He said a common theme of their meetings was "sacrifice". Westbrook opted in to the final year of his contract for 2022–23, valued at $47 million.

Sixth man role (2022–23)
After severing ties with his agent, Thad Foucher of Wasserman, in July 2022, Westbrook signed Jeff Schwartz of Excel Sports for his representation on August 1, 2022. During the off-season, the Lakers acquired point guards Patrick Beverley and Dennis Schröder. On October 28, Westbrook came off the bench for the first time since his rookie season and chipped in with 18 points and 8 rebounds in a 111–102 loss to the Minnesota Timberwolves. On December 9, Westbrook recorded his first career triple-double off the bench with 12 points, 11 rebounds, 11 assists and four steals in a 133–122 overtime loss to the Philadelphia 76ers. He became only the second Laker with a triple-double off the bench after Magic Johnson. On December 16, Westbrook put up a triple-double with 15 points, 11 rebounds, and 12 assists off the bench in a 128–106 win over the Denver Nuggets. He also became the first player in Lakers history to put up multiple triple-doubles off the bench. On December 28, Westbrook passed Charles Barkley for 28th place on the NBA's all-time scoring list.

On January 15, 2023, Westbrook put up 20 points, 14 rebounds, and 11 assists off the bench in a 113–112 loss to the Philadelphia 76ers. It was his fourth career triple-double off the bench, which set a record for the most triple-doubles off the bench in NBA history. On January 20, Westbrook had 29 points, five rebounds, and six assists, as the Lakers rallied a 122–121 win to snap the Memphis Grizzlies' winning streak at 11 games. On January 30, Westbrook made his 8,967th career assist in a 121–104 loss to the Brooklyn Nets, surpassing Gary Payton for tenth place in the NBA all-time career assists list.

On February 9, 2023, Westbrook was traded to the Utah Jazz in a three-team trade involving the Minnesota Timberwolves. He was averaging 15.9 points, 7.5 assists and 6.2 rebounds with the Lakers in a career-low 28.7 minutes per game. On February 20, he and the Jazz officially reached a contract buyout agreement.

Los Angeles Clippers (2023–present)
On February 22, 2023, Westbrook signed with the Los Angeles Clippers, reuniting him with his former Thunder teammate Paul George. On February 24, Westbrook made his Clippers debut, putting up 17 points and 14 assists in a 176–175 double overtime loss to the Sacramento Kings. It was the second-highest scoring game in NBA history. He also tied Andre Miller for the most assists in a debut in Clippers history. On March 3, Westbrook scored 27 points on 12-of-16 shooting from the field and delivered 10 assists in a 128–127 loss against the Sacramento Kings. On March 5, Westbrook won his first game as a member of the Clippers with a 135–129 come-from-behind victory against the Memphis Grizzlies. On March 11, Westbrook made his 9,062nd career assist in a 106–95 win over the New York Knicks, surpassing Isiah Thomas for ninth place in the NBA all-time career assists list.

National team career

In 2010, he was selected to the FIBA World Championship team in Istanbul, Turkey. On a team without a single member from its 2008 Olympic gold-medal team, Westbrook was considered a star on the team. The 2010 team relied heavily on a small lineup, and Westbrook finished in the top five on the team in minutes per game, and top three in points and assists per game. Team USA went 9–0 to win its first World Championship since 1994. The win automatically qualified Team USA for the 2012 Olympics in London, and they overtook Argentina for the No. 1 world ranking.

Westbrook was also selected to play for the 2012 Summer Olympic team in London, where he won a second gold medal. He declined an invitation to join the 2016 Olympic team.

Player profile

He is also widely known for playing at a high level of intensity and for being able to keep that intensity for the majority of his playing time. Westbrook will often look to push the pace of the game for transition points and attack the basket. Though attacking the rim is his forte, he will frequently pull up for medium-range jump shots. He regularly creates good scoring opportunities for his teammates, resulting in him averaging over eight assists per game for his career.

Westbrook is widely recognized as one of the best all-around players in the NBA. , his 182 regular season triple-doubles are the most in NBA history, and his 10 playoff triple-doubles are tied for fourth-most all time. He has the most rebounds in NBA history among guards who are 6'3" or shorter.

Westbrook's three-point shooting and turnovers are often brought to attention when pundits criticize his game. He averages 30% on three-point field goal attempts and 3.9 turnovers a game for his career. He has the worst career three-point percentage in NBA history of players who have more than 2,500 three-point attempts. He has also in the past been criticized for his "single-mindedness" and for being difficult to cooperate with.

Career statistics

NBA

Regular season

|-
| style="text-align:left;"|
| style="text-align:left;"|Oklahoma City
| style="background:#cfecec;"|82* || 65 || 32.5 || .398 || .271 || .815 || 4.9 || 5.3 || 1.3 || .2 || 15.3
|-
| style="text-align:left;"|
| style="text-align:left;"|Oklahoma City
| style="background:#cfecec;"|82* || style="background:#cfecec;"|82* || 34.3 || .418 || .221 || .780 || 4.9 || 8.0 || 1.3 || .4 || 16.1
|-
| style="text-align:left;"|
| style="text-align:left;"|Oklahoma City
| 82 || style="background:#cfecec;"|82* || 34.7 || .442 || .330 || .842 || 4.6 || 8.2 || 1.9 || .4 || 21.9
|-
| style="text-align:left;"|
| style="text-align:left;"|Oklahoma City
| style="background:#cfecec;"|66* || style="background:#cfecec;"|66* || 35.3 || .457 || .316 || .823 || 4.6 || 5.5 || 1.7 || .3 || 23.6
|-
| style="text-align:left;"|
| style="text-align:left;"|Oklahoma City
| style="background:#cfecec;"|82* || style="background:#cfecec;"|82* || 34.9 || .438 || .323 || .800 || 5.2 || 7.4 || 1.8 || .3 || 23.2
|-
| style="text-align:left;"|
| style="text-align:left;"|Oklahoma City
| 46 || 46 || 30.7 || .437 || .318 || .826 || 5.7 || 6.9 || 1.9 || .2 || 21.8
|-
| style="text-align:left;"|
| style="text-align:left;"|Oklahoma City
| 67 || 67 || 34.4 || .426 || .299 || .835 || 7.3 || 8.6 || 2.1 || .2 || style="background:#cfecec;"|28.1*
|-
| style="text-align:left;"|
| style="text-align:left;"|Oklahoma City
| 80 || 80 || 34.4 || .454 || .296 || .812 || 7.8 || 10.4 || 2.0 || .3 || 23.5
|-
| style="text-align:left;"|
| style="text-align:left;"|Oklahoma City
| 81 || 81 || 34.6 || .425 || .343 || .845 || 10.7 || 10.4 || 1.6 || .4 || style="background:#cfecec;"|31.6*
|-
| style="text-align:left;"|
| style="text-align:left;"|Oklahoma City
| 80 || 80 || 36.4 || .449 || .298 || .737 || 10.1 || style="background:#cfecec;"|10.3* || 1.8 || .3 || 25.4
|-
| style="text-align:left;"|
| style="text-align:left;"|Oklahoma City
| 73 || 73 || 36.0 || .428 || .290 || .656 || 11.1 || style="background:#cfecec;"|10.7* || 1.9 || .5 || 22.9
|-
| style="text-align:left;"|
| style="text-align:left;"|Houston
| 57 || 57 || 35.9 || .472 || .258 || .763 || 7.9 || 7.0 || 1.6 || .4 || 27.2
|-
| style="text-align:left;"|
| style="text-align:left;"|Washington
| 65 || 65 || 36.4 || .439 || .315 || .656 || 11.5 || style="background:#cfecec;"|11.7* || 1.4 || .4 || 22.2
|-
| style="text-align:left;"|
| style="text-align:left;"|L.A. Lakers
| 78 || 78 || 34.3 || .444 || .298 || .667 || 7.4 || 7.1 || 1.0 || .3 || 18.5
|-
| style="text-align:left;"|
| style="text-align:left;"|L.A. Lakers
| 52 || 3 || 28.7 || .417 || .296 || .655 || 6.2 || 7.5 || 1.0 || .4 || 15.9
|- class="sortbottom"
| style="text-align:center;" colspan="2"|Career
| 1,073 || 1,007 || 34.4 || .437 || .304 || .779 || 7.3 || 8.4 || 1.6 || .3 || 22.5
|- class="sortbottom"
| style="text-align:center;" colspan="2"|All-Star
| 9 || 2 || 22.4 || .506 || .338 || .588 || 5.2 || 3.8 || 1.4 || .0 || 21.6

Playoffs

|-
| style="text-align:left;"|2010
| style="text-align:left;"|Oklahoma City
| 6 || 6 || 35.3 || .473 || .417 || .842 || 6.0 || 6.0 || 1.7 || .2 || 20.5
|-
| style="text-align:left;"|2011
| style="text-align:left;"|Oklahoma City
| 17 || 17 || 37.5 || .394 || .292 || .852 || 5.4 || 6.4 || 1.4 || .4 || 23.8
|-
| style="text-align:left;"|2012
| style="text-align:left;"|Oklahoma City
| 20 || 20 || 38.4 || .435 || .277 || .802 || 5.5 || 5.8 || 1.6 || .4 || 23.1
|-
| style="text-align:left;"|2013
| style="text-align:left;"|Oklahoma City
| 2 || 2 || 34.0 || .415 || .222 || .857 || 6.5 || 7.0 || 3.0 || .0 || 24.0
|-
| style="text-align:left;"|2014
| style="text-align:left;"|Oklahoma City
| 19 || 19 || 38.7 || .420 || .280 || .884 || 7.3 || 8.1 || 2.2 || .3 || 26.7
|-
| style="text-align:left;"|2016
| style="text-align:left;"|Oklahoma City
| 18 || 18 || 37.4 || .405 || .324 || .829 || 6.9 || 11.0 || 2.6 || .1 || 26.0
|-
| style="text-align:left;"|2017
| style="text-align:left;"|Oklahoma City
| 5 || 5 || 38.8 || .388 || .265 || .800 || 11.6 || 10.8 || 2.4 || .4 ||37.4
|-
| style="text-align:left;"|2018
| style="text-align:left;"|Oklahoma City
| 6 || 6 || 39.2 || .398 || .357 || .825 || 12.0 || 7.5 || 1.5 || .0 || 29.3
|-
| style="text-align:left;"|2019
| style="text-align:left;"|Oklahoma City
| 5 || 5 || 39.4 || .360 || .324 || .885 || 8.8 || 10.6 || 1.0 || .6 || 22.8
|-
| style="text-align:left;"|2020
| style="text-align:left;"|Houston
| 8 || 8 || 32.8 || .421 || .242 || .532 || 7.0 || 4.6 || 1.5 || .3 || 17.9
|-
| style="text-align:left;"|2021
| style="text-align:left;"|Washington
| 5 || 5 || 37.2 || .333 || .250 || .791 || 10.4 || 11.8 || .4 || .2 || 19.0
|- class="sortbottom"
| style="text-align:center;" colspan="2"|Career
| 111 || 111 || 37.5 || .408 || .296 || .827 || 7.1 || 7.9 || 1.8 || .3 || 24.6

College

|-
| style="text-align:left;"|2006–07
| style="text-align:left;"|UCLA
| 36 || 1 || 9.0 || .457 || .409 || .548 || .8 || .7 || .4 || .0 || 3.4
|-
| style="text-align:left;"|2007–08
| style="text-align:left;"|UCLA
| 39 || 34 || 33.8 || .465 || .338 || .713 || 3.9 || 4.3 || 1.6 || .2 || 12.7
|- class="sortbottom"
| style="text-align:center;" colspan="2"|Career
| 75 || 35 || 21.9 || .464 || .354 || .685 || 2.4 || 2.5 || 1.0 || .1 || 8.3

Awards and honors

NBA
 NBA Most Valuable Player (2017)
 9× NBA All-Star (2011–2013, 2015–2020)
 2× NBA All-Star Game MVP (2015, 2016)
 2× All-NBA First Team (2016, 2017)
 5× All-NBA Second Team (2011–2013, 2015, 2018)
 2× All-NBA Third Team (2019, 2020)
 2× NBA scoring champion (2015, 2017)
 3× NBA assists leader (2018, 2019, 2021)
 NBA All-Rookie First Team (2009)
 NBA 75th Anniversary Team

College
 2008 All-Pac-10 Third Team
 2008 Pac-10 Defensive Player of the Year
 2008 Pac-10 All-Tournament Team
 2008 Pac-10 All-Defensive Team
 2008 CollegeInsider.com All-Defensive Team

High school
 First-team All-CIF Division I
 Third-team All-State
 2× Most Valuable Player of the Bay League

Business interests

Endorsements
In October 2012, Westbrook signed with the Jordan Brand. His first commercial was with the Jordan Brand and Champs in which a high school athlete purchased Jordan gear from Champs and transformed into Westbrook and won a state championship. In 2017, Westbrook signed a 10-year extension with Jordan Brand that gave him the largest total endorsement deal of any athlete sponsored by the brand.

In November 2013, Westbrook signed with Kings and Jaxs Boxer Briefs. He stated: "I have always loved fashion so working with Kings & Jaxs was a natural fit as we both have a fearless and creative approach to style." He signed with PepsiCo to become the global face of Mountain Dew Kickstart.

Fashion
In 2015, Westbrook was named Marketing Creative Director of the denim brand True Religion. In 2016, he launched the unisex streetwear brand Honor the Gift, which pays tribute to his years growing up in Hawthorne and Los Angeles.

Film
Westbrook made his production debut with Tulsa Burning: The 1921 Race Massacre about the Tulsa race massacre, which was inspired by his time playing in Oklahoma City. It received three Primetime Emmy nominations in 2021. He produced the short film Why Not? in a collaboration with Jordan Brand. He also produced his autobiographical documentary, Passion Play: Russell Westbrook, which debuted on Showtime in 2021.

Personal life
Westbrook and his wife have three children: one son and twin daughters.

Westbrook wears a "KB3" wristband and has "KB3" on his sneakers in honor of his childhood friend Khelcey Barrs III. In 2012, he started the Russell Westbrook Why Not? Foundation, which promotes community-based education and family service programs while pushing youngsters to be self-confident.

Publications

See also

 List of National Basketball Association career assists leaders
 List of National Basketball Association career scoring leaders
 List of National Basketball Association career turnovers leaders
 List of National Basketball Association career triple-double leaders
 List of National Basketball Association career playoff turnovers leaders
 List of National Basketball Association franchise career scoring leaders

References

External links

 NBA.com profile
 UCLA Bruins bio

1988 births
Living people
2010 FIBA World Championship players
20th-century African-American people
21st-century African-American sportspeople
African-American basketball players
African-American Christians
American men's basketball players
Basketball players at the 2012 Summer Olympics
Basketball players from Long Beach, California
FIBA World Championship-winning players
Houston Rockets players
Los Angeles Clippers players
Los Angeles Lakers players
Medalists at the 2012 Summer Olympics
National Basketball Association All-Stars
Oklahoma City Thunder players
Olympic gold medalists for the United States in basketball
Point guards
Seattle SuperSonics draft picks
Sportspeople from Los Angeles County, California
UCLA Bruins men's basketball players
United States men's national basketball team players
Washington Wizards players